Philip or Phil Roe may refer to:

 Phil Roe (politician) (born 1945), American politician and U.S. Representative 
 Phil Roe (footballer) (born 1991), English footballer 
 Philip L. Roe, British professor of aerospace engineering at the University of Michigan